Legislative elections were held in Åland on 2 and 3 September 1967.

Results

References

Elections in Åland
Aland
1967 in Finland